Carychium minimum is a species of very small air-breathing land snail, a terrestrial pulmonate gastropod mollusk in the family Ellobiidae.

Description
The width of the shell is 0.9-1.1 mm. The height of the shell is 1.6-2.2 mm. It is wider than the shell of Carychium tridentatum which it closely resembles. As in C. tridentatum shell is dull white and cylindrical and the mouth is oval with two denticles and a thickened lip. However if the last whorl above the aperture is opened this shows the plica parietalis (a spiral ridge on the parietal region projecting into the interior of the shell) descending in a simple way downwards.

Distribution 
The distribution of Carychium minimum is Euro-Asiatic.

 Northern Europe: Denmark, Finland, Norway, Sweden.
 Western Europe: Belgium, France and Corsica, Great Britain and Channel Islands, Ireland, Luxembourg, Netherlands, Switzerland.
 Central Europe: Austria, Czech Republic, Germany, Hungary, Liechtenstein, Poland, Slovakia, Slovenia.
 Southern Europe: Greece including North Aegean Islands, Italy.
 Southeastern Europe: Albania, Bosnia-Herzegovina, Bulgaria, Croatia, Montenegro, Romania, Serbia.
 Southwestern Europe: Andorra, Portugal including Azores and Madeira, Spain.
 Eastern Europe: Belarus, Crimea, Estonia, Kaliningrad, Latvia, Lithuania, Moldova, Ukraine, European Russia.
 Southwestern Asia: Turkey, Armenia, Azerbaijan, Georgia
 Western Siberia
 Central Asia: northern, central, and eastern Kazakhstan
 North America - introduced: Canada (British Columbia, Ontario, New Brunswick); USA (California, Massachusetts, New York, Pennsylvania)

References

External links

Carychium minimum at Animalbase
MolluscIreland

Ellobiidae
Gastropods described in 1774
Taxa named by Otto Friedrich Müller